Caloptilia deltanthes is a moth of the family Gracillariidae. It is known from the Marquesas Islands.

The larvae feed on Glochidion ramiflorum. They mine the leaves of their host plant.

References

deltanthes
Moths of Asia
Moths described in 1935